The Major League Baseball Players Association (MLBPA) is the union representing all current Major League Baseball players. All players, managers, coaches, and athletic trainers who hold or have held a signed contract with a Major League club are eligible for membership in the Association.

The MLBPA has three major divisions: a labor union, a business (Players Choice Group Licensing Program), and a charitable foundation (Major League Baseball Players Trust).

The MLBPA primarily serves as a collective bargaining representative for all Major League Baseball players, as well as playing significant roles in MLB-related business and nonprofit affairs.

On August 28, 2022, the MLBPA publicly launched a campaign to help minor league baseball players unionize. On September 9, 2022, MLB voluntarily recognized the MLBPA as the union for over 5,500 minor league baseball players playing rookie ball to Triple-A.

Players Choice group licensing
The MLBPA's Players Choice group licensing program utilizes collective marketing to assist licensees and sponsors who want to associate their brands and products with that of Major League players, teams, and coaches. Through an individual agreement with each player, the MLBPA holds exclusive right to use, license and sublicense the names, numbers, nicknames, likenesses, signatures and other personal indicia (known as publicity rights) of active Major League Baseball players who are its members for use in connection with any product, brand, service or product line when more than two players are involved.

Among its other functions, the Players Choice licensing program also protects the rights of players from exploitation by unauthorized parties.

Major League Baseball Players Trust

Major League Baseball players also formed the Players Trust, a charitable foundation that is the first of its kind in professional sports. Through the Players Trust, Major Leaguers contribute their time, money and fame to call attention to important issues affecting those in need and to help encourage others to get involved in their own communities.

Many programs including Buses for Baseball, City Clinics, Medicines for Humanity, the Players Choice Awards and Volunteers of America are funded through the foundation.

Action Team

In 2003, the Major League Baseball Players Trust and Volunteers of America created the Action Team National Youth Volunteer Program to recruit and train high school students to become volunteers in their communities.

Players Choice Awards

The Players Choice Awards is an award ceremony held to recognize each season's best performers, as chosen by the players themselves. Each Players Choice Awards winner designates the charity of his choice to receive a grant from the Player's Trust.

History
The MLBPA was not the first attempt to unionize baseball players. Earlier attempts had included:
Brotherhood of Professional Baseball Players - 1885 (founded by John Montgomery Ward)

In 1898, Baltimore Orioles players John McGraw, Hughie Jennings, Joe Kelley, and Willie Keeler discussed the formation of "mutual defense organization" analogous to a trade union and meant to protect the interests of the players.

Players' Protective Association - 1900
Fraternity of Professional Baseball Players of America - 1912
National Baseball Players Association of the United States - 1922 (founded by Raymond Joseph Cannon)
The American Baseball Guild – 1946 (founded by labor lawyer Robert Murphy)

Leadership

Pre-unionized
President
Bob Feller: 1956–1959
Executive Director
Frank Scott: May 1, 1959 – 1966

Unionized
Executive Director
Ken Moffett: December 9, 1982 – November 22, 1983
Marvin Miller (interim): November 22, 1983 – December 9, 1983
Donald Fehr (acting): December 9, 1983 – December 1, 1985
Donald Fehr: December 1, 1985 – June 22, 2009
Michael Weiner: June 22, 2009 – November 21, 2013
Tony Clark: December 2, 2013 – present

The Marvin Miller era (1966–1983)
That year the newly recognized union hired Marvin Miller from the United Steel Workers of America to head the organization, serving as executive director until . During Miller's tenure, base salaries, pension funds, licensing rights, and revenues increased.

In , Miller negotiated the first collective bargaining agreement (CBA) with the team owners, which raised the minimum salary from $6,000 to $10,000 per year. The  CBA included arbitration to resolve disputes.

In , when Oakland owner Charlie Finley failed to make a $50,000 payment into an insurance annuity as called for in Catfish Hunter's contract, the MLBPA took the case to arbitration. The arbitrator ruled that Hunter could be a free agent.

When pitchers Andy Messersmith and Dave McNally had their 1974 contracts automatically renewed by their teams, the MLBPA supported them by challenging the reserve clause which was used by team owners to bind players to one team. On December 23, 1975, arbitrator Peter Seitz ruled in favor of the players. Following the Seitz decision, the modern free agent system was created, and the strength of the union was immeasurably increased.

In the late 1980s and early 1990s the MLBPA filed collusion charges, arguing that team owners had violated the collective bargaining agreement in the 1985–1987 seasons. The MLBPA won each case, resulting in "second look" free agents, and over $269 million in owner fines.

The Donald Fehr era (1985–2009) 
After Miller retired, Ken Moffett became the new executive director in December 1982, but in November 1983 he was dismissed, and Marvin Miller was named interim director. Donald Fehr was named acting director in December 1983. Miller supported a strong antidrug policy, whereas Fehr opposed penalizing players.

The MLBPA under Donald Fehr filed several grievances against MLB owners. In the late 1980s MLB owners were accused of collusion to prevent player salaries from rising. The MLBPA filed grievances against the owners in 1986 and 1987. In 1987, arbitrator Tom Roberts found that owners had violated the terms of the Basic Agreement with players later being awarded a total of $10.5 million. In 1989, arbitrator George Nicolau found that owners had violated the Basic Agreement on the second grievance with players awarded $38 million.

In 1988, the MLBPA filed another grievance against the owners for colluding to control player salaries. The MLBPA claims that the owners created an information bank to share information on players and restrain salaries. The MLBPA won this grievance in 1990 with a settlement being reached to award players a total of $280 million in damages for the collusion.

Under Fehr the MLBPA dealt with a 32 day lockout by MLB owners. Also under Fehr, the Players Association participated in a 232 day players strike in 1994 over player salaries. While Fehr was MLBPA director player salaries rose from an average of over $400,000 to $3 million. The Collective Bargaining Agreements in 2002 and 2006 were reached without a strike by the players or a lockout by the owners. This was a period of 16 years without labor disputes by either side.

Donald Fehr was also a contributor in the creation and developing of the World Baseball Classic, an international tournament for baseball. In 2009, Donald Fehr resigned from the position of director, while the players selected Michael Weiner to take his place.

Recent history

Donald Fehr joined the MLBPA as general counsel in 1977 and was named executive director in 1985, leading it through the 1994 Major League Baseball strike and recent issues. On June 22, Fehr announced he would step down, and after a transition period and was replaced by the union's general counsel, Michael Weiner.

On November 21, 2013, MLBPA Executive Director Michael Weiner died after a 15-month battle with a non-operable brain tumor. He was 51 years old. Tony Clark, the deputy executive director, was named executive director on December 2, 2013, the first former major league player to hold the position.

In 2016, the MLBPA celebrated its 50th anniversary as a union, commemorating the event at the 2016 Major League Baseball All-Star Game with a redesigned golden logo and merchandise such as T-shirts.

Basic agreements
In 1968, the Major League Baseball Players Association negotiated the first-ever Collective Bargaining Agreement (CBA) in professional sports. Several agreements have been negotiated since the original agreement, the latest of which expired on Dec. 1, 2021. The expiration of the CBA resulted in the first player lockout since 1990. All transactions are halted as a result of the lockout and players are forbidden from contacting team officials until a new agreement is reached.

MLBPA/MLB joint initiatives

Joint Drug Agreement
The Joint Drug Agreement went into effect in December 2011 and is scheduled to terminate Dec. 1, 2016, the same date as the Basic Agreement. The prohibited substances section of the Joint Drug Agreement is updated annually.

Domestic violence policy
In August 2015, Major League Baseball and the MLBPA reached agreement on the Joint Domestic Violence, Sexual Assault and Child Abuse Policy, and is intended to provide a comprehensive policy addressing issues such as protecting the legal rights of players, treating violations seriously, holding players accountable through appropriate disciplinary measures and providing resources for the intervention and care of victims, families and the players themselves.

The terms of this joint policy cover four primary areas: Treatment & Intervention; Investigations; Discipline; and Training, Education & Resources.

Youth baseball initiative
In June 2016, Executive Director Tony Clark and Commissioner of Baseball Rob Manfred, along with Curtis Granderson, Andrew McCutchen, Marquis Grissom, and Ken Griffey Jr., announced major initiatives within youth baseball in a press conference held at Citi Field.

On top of jointly donating over $2 million several youth-focused initiatives supported by current and former Major League player, other major initiatives included financial contributions to youth baseball projects and the creation of a partnership with Positive Coaching Alliance for the training of coaches and administrators from the Reviving Baseball in Inner Cities program.

Miscellaneous

Salary cap
As of 2019, Major League Baseball is the only major professional sports league in North America that does not have a salary cap; the MLS, NHL, NBA, and NFL all implement some sort of salary cap. MLB does have a luxury tax that penalizes clubs that exceed the designated amount for that season.

Steroids

The MLBPA was initially opposed to random steroid testing, claiming it to be a violation of the privacy of players. After enormous negative publicity surrounding the alleged or actual involvement of several star players in the BALCO steroid scandal, the players dropped their opposition to a steroid testing program and developed a consensus that favored testing. Under pressure from US Congress which threatened to pass a law if the MLB's drug policy was not strengthened, the baseball union agreed in 2005 to a stricter policy that would include 50-game, 100-game, and lifetime suspensions.

See also

Japan Professional Baseball Players Association

Similar organizations
National Basketball Players Association
MLS Players Association
National Hockey League Players Association

References

Further reading 

 Fink, Gary M. ed. (1977) Labor unions (Greenwood, 1977) pp. 30–32.  online
 Helyar, John. (1994). Lords of the Realm: The Real History of Baseball. New York: Villard. .
 Korr, Charles P. (2002). The End of Baseball as We Knew It: The Players Union, 1960–81. Urbana: University of Illinois Press. .

External links

Players Association
Sports trade unions of the United States
Baseball organizations
Trade unions established in 1953
1953 establishments in the United States